Guy François (1578 – 1650) was a French painter.

Biography
He was born in Le Puy and travelled to Italy, where he worked in the workshop of Carlo Saraceni in Venice during the years 1615–1619. He signed his works "Guido Francesco". He is known for religious works in the style of Caravaggio.

He died in Le Puy-en-Velay.

References

Guy François on Artnet

1578 births
1650 deaths
French painters
People from Le Puy-en-Velay
French expatriates in Italy